The 2009 NHK Trophy was the fourth event of six in the 2009–10 ISU Grand Prix of Figure Skating, a senior-level international invitational competition series. It was held at the Big Hat in Nagano on November 5–8. Medals were awarded in the disciplines of men's singles, ladies' singles, pair skating, and ice dancing. Skaters earned points toward qualifying for the 2009–10 Grand Prix Final. The compulsory dance was the Tango Romantica.

Schedule
All times are Japan Standard Time (UTC+9).

 Friday, November 6
 14:30 Ice dancing - Compulsory dance
 15:45 Pairs - Short program
 17:10 Men - Short program
 19:05 Ladies - Short program
 Saturday, November 7
 12:45 Ice dancing - Original dance
 14:15 Pairs - Free skating
 15:55 Men - Free skating
 18.50 Ladies - Free skating
 Sunday, November 8
 13:00 Ice dancing - Free dance
 16:00 Gala exhibition

Results

Men

Ladies

 WD = Withdrawn

Pairs

Ice dancing

References

External links

 
 
 
 2009 NHK Trophy at the Japan Skating Federation

Nhk Trophy, 2009
NHK Trophy